Hurlburt Field  is a United States Air Force installation located in Okaloosa County, Florida, immediately west of the town of Mary Esther. It is part of the greater Eglin Air Force Base reservation and is home to Headquarters Air Force Special Operations Command (AFSOC), the 1st Special Operations Wing (1 SOW), the USAF Special Operations School (USAFSOS) and the Air Combat Command's (ACC) 505th Command and Control Wing. It was named for First Lieutenant Donald Wilson Hurlburt, who died in a crash at Eglin.

This facility is assigned a three-letter location identifier of HRT by the Federal Aviation Administration, but it does not have an International Air Transport Association (IATA) airport code (the IATA assigned HRT to RAF Linton-on-Ouse in England).

History
Hurlburt began as a small training field for the much larger Eglin Field. It was initially designated Eglin Auxiliary Field No. 9, and later as Eglin Air Force Base Auxiliary Field 9/Hurlburt Field when the U.S. Air Force became an independent service, before being administratively separated from the rest of the Eglin AFB complex in the 1950s. However, once separated, the facility retained its history and kept all building numbers the same; i.e., all start with a "9". The installation was named by then-Eglin Field base commander Brigadier General Grandison Gardner for First Lieutenant Donald Wilson Hurlburt (1919–1943), who was killed in an aircraft crash at the main base, then known as Eglin Field, in 1943.

The facility had previously been named the Eglin-Hurlburt Airdrome until 1943; Hurlburt Field, March 1944; Eglin Auxiliary Field No. 9, October 1944; with the current name official on January 13, 1948. The base commander of Eglin Main was also responsible for Hurlburt, 1942–1946, but when the base reactivated on February 1, 1955, it gained a separate commander.

Donald Wilson Hurlburt
After flying combat missions from Great Britain in B-17s and receiving the Distinguished Flying Cross (DFC), Lieutenant Hurlburt was assigned in mid-1943 to the First Proving Ground Electronics Test Unit at Eglin Field. He died on October 1, 1943, when his Lockheed AT-18 Hudson gunnery trainer, 42-55591, crashed during take-off at Eglin. An official history of Eglin AFB's early years cites October 2, 1943 date for this accident, and also notes that Capt. Barclay H. Dillon, test pilot of the Fighter Section of the 1st Proving Ground Group, died in another accident the same date. Auxiliary Field No. 10 was later named Eglin Dillon Airdrome, now known primarily as Naval Outlying Landing Field Choctaw, a Navy auxiliary field to Naval Air Station Pensacola and NAS Whiting Field. Hurlburt's nephew was Captain Craig D. Button, USAF, noted for his mysterious flight and crash of an A-10 Thunderbolt on April 2, 1997.

Doolittle Raiders
Lieutenant Colonel Jimmy Doolittle and his Raiders could not have practiced take offs with their B-25 Mitchell bombers at Auxiliary Field No. 9, as it, and the requisite hard-surfaced runway, did not exist in March 1942. "A former Hurlburt Field base commander in the 1950s may have started this story, and several official histories and raider interviews have perpetuated this belief." Nonetheless, the short cross-field former runway, near the southern end of Hurlburt Field's main runway, is now named the Doolittle Taxiway. Other Eglin fields, including Wagner Field/Eglin Auxiliary Field No. 1, and Duke Field/Eglin Auxiliary Field No. 3, were used during this training.

For the 2008 gathering of Doolittle mission survivors, six crew were present for recognition in Fort Walton Beach, Florida, culminating in a reenactment of the training sessions by three civilian-owned B-25 Mitchells at Duke Field on 31 May. Navy personnel from NAS Pensacola, as flight deck "shirt" crew, represented that service's contribution to the Tokyo mission.

Drones and missiles
Gulf-facing launch sites for drones beginning with Republic-Ford JB-2 Loons, American copies of the V-1 "buzz bombs", were operated on Santa Rosa Island, from Site A-15, directly south of Field 9 from the fall of 1944 in anticipation of Operation Olympic against Japan from captured Pacific island bases. The atomic missions put paid to this operation. This launch site is now on the National Register of Historic Places.

The 4751st Air Defense Wing (Missile) was organized at Hurlburt on October 1, 1957. It was redesignated the 4751st Air Defense Missile Wing on January 15, 1958 and discontinued on July 1, 1962 when Tactical Air Command took over the field. Its subordinate 4751st Air Defense Missile Squadron continued operations as a tenant until November 30, 1979. It operated IM-99/CIM-10 Bomarc surface-to-air missiles from this site. On August 18, 1960, a Bomarc missile from the Santa Rosa launch facility made a direct hit on its target, a QB-47E drone of the 3205th Drone Group, marking the first shoot-down of a multi-jet medium bomber by a surface-to-air missile.

The 6555th Guided Missile Wing operated CGM-13/TGM-13 Mace cruise missiles from the island. On January 5, 1967 an international incident was narrowly avoided when a TGM-13 Mace, launched from Santa Rosa Island, which was supposed to circle over the Gulf on a racetrack course for shoot-down by a pair of Eglin F-4 Phantoms, instead, headed south for Cuba. A third F-4 overtook the drone, firing two test AAMs with no effect, and damaged it with cannon fire, but the unarmed Mace actually overflew the western tip of Cuba before crashing in open water some  further south. The final Mace launches from Hurlburt Site A-15 took place in June 1974. Other launches in the 1960s included six high-altitude releases of vaporized barium from 2-stage Nike Iroquois sounding rockets in January 1967 to measure wind speeds and directions in the upper atmosphere, conducted under the auspices of the Air Force Cambridge Research Laboratories in conjunction with the Space Systems Branch of the Aircraft and Missile Test Division, Air Proving Ground Center, Eglin AFB.

Tactical bombardment
Hurlburt Field fell into disrepair following World War II but was reactivated in 1955. The 17th Bombardment Wing was reactivated on April 1, 1955 and assigned to the Ninth Air Force, with the 34th, 37th, and 95th Bomb Squadrons assigned under the 17th Bomb Group. "Officers and airmen of the 17th crossed the Pacific in three echelons. Some flew their B-26's  from Miho Air Base, Japan, to Florida. The main body made the trip on the troop ship General Gaffney, while another group, comprising airmen from other Fifth Air Force units, arrived in San Francisco in early April 1955, aboard the pocket aircraft carrier, the Cape Esperance."

The 17th Bomb Wing was stationed at Eglin AFB, Florida, operating from Hurlburt Field, where it was programmed to receive the Martin B-57 Canberra, the replacement for the B-26 Invader. However, the B-57 proved to be troublesome and unreliable and only three or four were ever delivered to Hurlburt. On October 1, 1955, Hurlburt was redesignated the 17th Bombardment Wing, Tactical, and received B-66 aircraft in early 1956.

The first jet aircraft to land at Hurlburt was a Lockheed T-33 Shooting Star which arrived from Ninth Air Force Headquarters, Shaw AFB, South Carolina, on July 28, 1955, piloted by Maj. J. H. Murrow and Maj. L. F. Collins. "Pilots of the 17th Bomb Wing will in the near future be flying T-33's  for instrument and transitional training to prepare for the new B-66 bomber which is slated for delivery to the wing..." The first B-66 arrived at Hurlburt on March 16, 1956, after a flight from Norton AFB, California, piloted by 17th Bomb Wing commander Col. Howard F. Bronson, with Col. Norton W. Sanders, commanding officer of the 17th Bomb Group, as observer.

The 17th Bomb Wing was equipped with the Douglas B-66B Destroyer and operated the jet light bomber at Hurlburt from 1956 until 1958, then the wing was moved to a base in England. The 17th was inactivated on June 25, 1958 due to budgetary cutbacks.

With the reactivation of Hurlburt, housing was at a premium, and Lieutenant Colonel Robert S. Kramer, Assistant Army District Engineer at Mobile, Alabama, announced on April 5, 1956, that a contract had been awarded in the amount of $3,315,143.34 to the McDonough Construction Company of Georgia, Atlanta, Georgia, for the construction of 151 buildings of concrete block with brick facing. Residences would be single and duplex quarters with two, three, and four bedrooms. Construction began on the first 48 buildings (72 units) in mid-April, with initial completion expected by February 1957.

Special operations
On April 14, 1961 the Air Force Tactical Air Command (TAC) activated the 4400th Combat Crew Training Squadron at Hurlburt, to fly operations against guerrillas, either as an overt Air Force operation or in an undefined covert capacity. Known by its nickname "Jungle Jim", the unit was commanded by Colonel Benjamin H. King. The squadron was authorized 16 C-47s, eight B-26s and eight T-28 Trojans, plus the same number of aircraft in temporary storage. The T-28s were armed with caliber .50 machine guns, 2.75-in. rockets and a small quantity of bombs. These specialists flew missions in Africa, Southeast Asia, Central America and other places throughout the world. In early 1962, plans for the never executed Operation Northwoods called for decoy aircraft to land at this base.

From the 1960s into the early 1970s, the base hosted a wide variety of aircraft types, including A-1E Skyraiders, AC-119G Shadow and AC-119K Stinger gunships, AC-47 Spooky gunships, AC-130A Spectre gunships, B-26K Counter-Invaders (including those deployed to the Congo), UC-123Ks with underwing jet pods, OV-10A Forward Air Control Broncos, Cessna O-2A Skymaster FAC and O-2B PSYOPS aircraft, QU-22B recon drones, and other long-serving C-47s in various support roles. Following the conclusion of the war in Southeast Asia, most reciprocating engine types were retired by the USAF. UH-1s and CH-3s were operated, the latter by the 20th Special Operations Squadron.

The 4410th Combat Crew Training Wing was activated at Hurlburt Field on December 1, 1965, later moving to England AFB, Louisiana, in July 1969. "In early 1967 the wing comprised four squadrons; two were at Hurlburt, the 4408th CCTS training C-123 crews and the 4409th training A-1E and T-28 pilots, including Vietnamese students. The 4410th CCTS at Holley Field primarily trained O-1 Forward Air Controllers and students flying the U-10 and O-2. In December the 4407th CCTS would be activated to assume the mission of the 4410th while that unit began training crews in the new OV-10 Bronco FAC aircraft. The fourth squadron, the 4412th CCTS was at England AFB, training C-47D and AC-47D pilots. On 1 April the 4532nd CCTS was activated to fly A-37Bs and assigned to the Wing. Later in the year both the 4412th and 4532nd were reassigned to the 1st ACW at England AFB."

The first jet-augmented Fairchild C-123K Provider arrived at Hurlburt Field on January 5, 1968, and the first of 76 of the type to be ferried to Vietnam by the 319th Air Commando Squadron departed on April 10.

The 20th Special Operations Squadron reactivated in 1976 at Hurlburt Field, the unit mission remaining unconventional warfare and special operations using UH-1N gunships and CH-3Es. The HH-53H Pave Low replaced the CH-3E in 1980, providing a long range, heavier lift helicopter capability. "The Air Force's newly operational fleet of nine HH-53H Pave Low CSAR helicopters was abruptly transferred to the special operations forces in response to the failed Iranian hostage rescue attempt and the lack of dedicated long-range vertical lift platforms." "The helicopters brought 200 new military jobs to Hurlburt, bringing the number of military positions at the base to 3,200."

In the early 1960s, Hurlburt was utilized as a Strategic Air Command dispersal base for B-47s of the 306th Bomb Wing at MacDill AFB, Florida.

Most facilities were located west of the runway, including hangars, through the 1980s. With the growth and importance of special operation capabilities, Lockheed AC-130 Spectre/Spooky gunship and MC-130 Combat Talon/Combat Spear operations have remained on the western flight line, while additional hangars and ramps have been constructed northeast of the intersection of the main runway and the Doolittle runway. These newer facilities are home to CV-22 Osprey operations of the 413th Flight Test Squadron of the 96th Test Wing, and the recently retired MH-53J Pave Low III and MH-53M Pave Low IV helicopter. The Air Force Special Operations Command continues to fly sensitive operations missions from Hurlburt Field worldwide.

The USAF Special Operations School (USAFSOS) trains US Air Force, Army, Navy, Marine Corps, Coast Guard and US government civilian personnel in a variety of courses, including courses in Dynamics of International Terrorism, and the Middle East Orientation Course.

The Joint Special Operations University (JSOU) was previously located at Hurlburt Field until its relocation to MacDill AFB in 2011. JSOU's lecturers include specialists from all branches of the US military, the US Department of State, Central Intelligence Agency, civilian universities, and nongovernmental organizations.

The Florida Air National Guard activated the 249th Special Operations Squadron at Hurlburt Field on 28 August 2020. The squadron, part of the 125th Fighter Wing, operates the CV-22B Osprey and is assigned to Air Force Special Operations Command.

Facilities
Hurlburt Field has a  runway designated 18/36 and a  helipad, both with concrete surfaces.

Base housing is located across from the main base divided by U.S. 98 along the beachfront of Santa Rosa Sound.

The Reef is the main dining facility on base and has won the title of best dining facility in the Air Force nine times.

A grade-separated intersection at the main gate with a fly-over on U.S. 98 was completed in the summer of 2015, greatly relieving a long-time traffic bottleneck.

Airpark
Starting in 1970s there was an effort to preserve the history of Air Commando operations and the Airmen involved. As part of this effort aircraft of significance were collected and memorials erected to significant operations and individuals dating back to World War II. The air park was open to the general public via special pass until the enhanced security of the post 9/11 era was enacted resulting in the park currently being inaccessible to the general public.

Based units
Flying and notable non-flying units based at Hurlburt Field.

Units marked GSU are Geographically Separate Units, which although based at Hurlburt, are subordinate to a parent unit based at another location.

United States Air Force

Air Force Special Operations Command (AFSOC)

Headquarters Air Force Special Operations Command
1st Special Operations Wing (host)
1st Special Operations Air Operations Squadron
1st Special Operations Comptroller Squadron
1st Special Operations Group
1st Special Operations Support Squadron
4th Special Operations Squadron – AC-130J Ghostrider, AC-130U Spooky
8th Special Operations Squadron – CV-22B Osprey
11th Special Operations Intelligence Squadron
15th Special Operations Squadron – MC-130H Combat Talon II and MC-130J Commando II
23rd Special Operations Weather Squadron
34th Special Operations Squadron – U-28A Draco
65th Special Operations Squadron – MQ-9A Reaper
73rd Special Operations Squadron – AC-130J Ghostrider
319th Special Operations Squadron – U-28A Draco
Detachment 1 – AC-130J Ghostrider
1st Special Operations Maintenance Group
1st Special Operations Aircraft Maintenance Squadron
1st Special Operations Maintenance Squadron
1st Special Operations Munitions Squadron
801st Special Operations Aircraft Maintenance Squadron
901st Special Operations Aircraft Maintenance Squadron
1st Special Operations Mission Support Group
1st Special Operations Civil Engineer Squadron
1st Special Operations Communications Squadron
1st Special Operations Contracting Squadron
1st Special Operations Force Support Squadron
1st Special Operations Logistics Readiness Squadron
1st Special Operations Security Forces Squadron
1st Special Operations Medical Group
1st Special Operations Healthcare Operations Squadron
1st Special Operations Medical Readiness Squadron
1st Special Operations Medical Support Squadron
24th Special Operations Wing
720th Special Tactics Group
23rd Special Tactics Squadron
720th Operations Support Squadron
492nd Special Operations Wing
US Air Force Special Operations School
492nd Special Operations Group
18th Flight Test Squadron
19th Special Operations Squadron – AC-130J Ghostrider, AC-130U Spooky, MC-130H Combat Talon II and U-28A Draco
492nd Special Operations Training Group
371st Special Operations Combat Training Squadron
492nd Special Operations Advanced Capabilities Squadron

Air Combat Command (ACC)

US Air Force Warfare Center
57th Wing
USAF Weapons School
14th Weapons Squadron (GSU) – AC-130U Spooky, AC-130W Stinger II, CV-22B Osprey, MC-130H Combat Talon II, MC-130J Commando II and U-28A Draco
505th Command and Control Wing
505th Test and Evaluation Group
84th Radar Evaluation Squadron
605th Test and Evaluation Squadron
505th Training Group
505th Combat Training Squadron
505th Communications Squadron
505th Training Squadron
705th Training Squadron
Fifteenth Air Force
800th RED HORSE Group 
823rd RED HORSE Squadron (GSU)
Sixteenth Air Force
67th Cyberspace Wing
318th Cyberspace Operations Group
39th Information Operations Squadron (GSU)
363rd Intelligence, Surveillance and Reconnaissance Wing
361st Intelligence, Surveillance, and Reconnaissance Group (GSU)
25th Intelligence Squadron
 557th Weather Wing
 2nd Weather Group
2nd Combat Weather Systems Squadron (GSU)

Air Force Materiel Command (AFMC)

96th Test Wing
96th Operations Group
413th Flight Test Squadron (GSU) – AC-130U Spooky, AC-130J Ghostrider, MC-130H Combat Talon II, CV-22B Osprey, and U-28A Draco

Air Force Reserve Command (AFRC)
 Tenth Air Force 
 655th Intelligence, Surveillance and Reconnaissance Wing
 755th Intelligence, Surveillance and Reconnaissance Group
 28th Intelligence Squadron (GSU)
 919th Special Operations Wing
 919th Special Operations Group
 2nd Special Operations Squadron – MQ-9A Reaper (GSU)
 5th Special Operations Squadron – U-28A Draco (GSU)
556th Red Horse Squadron

Air National Guard (ANG)

Florida Air National Guard
125th Fighter Wing
249th Special Operations Squadron (GSU) – CV-22B Osprey

In popular culture
The Transformers 3'' movie, in production in September 2010, and featuring the CV-22 Osprey and AC-130U Spooky, was filmed in part at Hurlburt Field. A number of Hurlburt Airmen were used as extras in the film.
The NBA Miami Heat ran a week-long preseason training camp at the Aderholt Fitness Center on Hurlburt Field, September 28, 2010.

See also
Florida World War II Army Airfields
List of United States Air Force installations

References

External links

My Hurlburt – base force support squadron

Installations of the United States Air Force in Florida
Army Air Forces School of Applied Tactics Airfields
Airfields of the United States Army Air Forces in Florida
Buildings and structures in Okaloosa County, Florida
Former census-designated places in Florida
1942 establishments in Florida
Transportation buildings and structures in Okaloosa County, Florida